The men's decathlon event at the 1992 World Junior Championships in Athletics was held in Seoul, Korea, at Olympic Stadium on 16 and 17 September.

Medalists

Results

Final
16/17 September

Participation
According to an unofficial count, 20 athletes from 16 countries participated in the event.

References

Decathlon
Combined events at the World Athletics U20 Championships